"Bigmouth Strikes Again" is a 1986 song by the English rock band the Smiths from their third album The Queen Is Dead. Written by Johnny Marr and Morrissey, the song features self-deprecating lyrics that reflected Morrissey's frustrations with the music industry at the time. Musically, the song was inspired by the Rolling Stones' "Jumpin' Jack Flash" and centres around a guitar riff that Marr wrote during a 1985 soundcheck.

"Bigmouth Strikes Again" was released as the lead single from the album, bypassing Rough Trade's preferred choice, "There Is a Light That Never Goes Out". The single reached number 26 in the UK Singles Chart and has since seen critical acclaim along with several version recorded by other artists.

Background
"Bigmouth Strikes Again" began as a lyric written by Morrissey in the summer of 1985. The lyric was the final one of three written about Morrissey's frustration with the music industry, the previous two being "The Boy with the Thorn in His Side" and "Rubber Ring." "Bigmouth Strikes Again" specifically reflects Morrissey's negative experiences with the music press. When asked by the NME about the song, Morrissey replied, "I can't think of one sentence [I regret saying]. We're still at that stage where if I rescued a kitten from drowning, they'd say: 'Morrissey Mauls Kitten's Body'. So what can you do?"

Morrissey intended the lyrics of the song to be humorous; he explained, "I would call it a parody if that sounded less like self-celebration, which it definitely wasn't. It was just a really funny song". Drummer Mike Joyce commented, "What a fantastic title – one of Mozzer's better ones. And with this song, you can see why he made journalists cream their pants. Listen to the lyrical content. He was a one-off."

Johnny Marr based the song's music on a guitar riff he had written during a soundcheck of the band's 1985 tour. Marr later claimed that he had been inspired by the Rolling Stones' "Jumpin' Jack Flash", stating, "I wanted something that was a rush all the way through, without a distinct middle eight as such. I thought the guitar breaks should be percussive, not too pretty or cordial". Marr described the song as being "as close as getting to the sound of my heroes as we came".

Music and lyrics
During the song, the protagonist compares himself to Joan of Arc as "the flames rose to her Roman nose" and also says "now I know how Joan of Arc felt". In recent solo performances, Morrissey has changed the lyric "and her Walkman started to melt", to the more technologically current "and her iPod started to melt". Morrissey included the lyric "and her hearing aid started to melt" as a tribute to the band's deaf and hard-of-hearing fans.

Initially the band had asked Kirsty MacColl to contribute backing vocals, but Marr found her harmonies "really weird" and they were left off the final recording. Instead, the backing vocals were recorded by Morrissey and altered to a higher pitch. This is credited to "Ann Coates", a reference to the Manchester district of Ancoats.

Release
Though "Bigmouth Strikes Again" was initially planned to be released as the debut single from The Queen Is Dead in autumn 1985, by spring 1986, Rough Trade head Geoff Travis pushed for the band to release "There Is a Light That Never Goes Out" instead. At Marr's insistence, the band stuck with "Bigmouth Strikes Again": Marr preferred to release a more assertive single and liked the idea of releasing a single-calibre song as an album track on every Smiths album.

"Bigmouth Strikes Again" was released as a single in May 1986, with the non-album instrumental song "Money Changes Everything" as the B-side. Marr later reused the music from "Money Changes Everything" for Bryan Ferry's 1987 hit single "The Right Stuff", which featured new lyrics from Ferry. 

The single version's sleeve cover contains a photograph of James Dean by Nelva Jean Thomas. On the 12{{}} single, the band quoted Oscar Wilde's famous line "Talent borrows, genius steals" on the runout groove. The single reached number 26 in the UK.

A live version of the song appeared as the closing song on the band's only live album, Rank. Another live version, recorded at the Greek Theatre in Berkeley, California in August 1986, was released in 2017 to promote a collector's edition of The Queen Is Dead.Reception
"Bigmouth Strikes Again" has seen critical acclaim since its release. Decades later critic Stephen Thomas Erlewine of AllMusic would praise the song's "minor-key rush," while Clash wrote that the song's "brash Stones-esque rock and sharp guitar lines still sound vital today." Far Out wrote that the song was "the perfect combination of Morrissey’s playful self-deprecating lyricism coupled with Johnny Marr’s ferociously upbeat riff which is a combination that many other acts have tried to replicate but nobody has managed to capture the magic that these two would create in their five active years together."

Several publications have ranked the song as one of the band's best songs. Billboard ranked the song as the band's second best, while NME named it the band's fourth best. Paste called it the band's tenth best, while Louder included it in their unranked top ten, writing, "This could be their most iconic song." Rolling Stone ranked it as the Smiths' 13th best, writing, Bigmouth' was the funniest song they'd ever done – that drum break alone is a comic masterpiece." Consequence of Sound listed the song as the band's 19th best.

Track listing

Charts

Certifications

Cover versions
Treepeople version
Seattle-based, Idaho indie rock/grunge band Treepeople covered "Bigmouth Strikes Again" on their 1992 double EP Something Vicious for Tomorrow/Time Whore, released by an independent Seattle label C/Z Records. The Treepeople version changes the second line of the first verse from "When I said by rights you should be bludgeoned in your bed" to "When I said I am gonna miss you when you're dead." This version was notable for having been recorded by Seattle grunge pioneer/producer Jack Endino of Skin Yard, who had previously worked with Mudhoney, Nirvana and Soundgarden, as well as having been mixed by Seattle production legend Steve Fisk, known for his work with notable acts like Nirvana, Screaming Trees, Seaweed, The Afghan Whigs and Love Battery.

Placebo version
The song was covered in 1996 by alternative band Placebo, who were asked by the French magazine Les Inrockuptibles to perform the song for the various artists compilation The Smiths Is Dead. This version changed the lyric "and her Walkman started to melt'" to "and her Discman/Megadrive started to melt." Their rendition of the song also appeared as a B-side to "Nancy Boy", as well as on Disc 2 of the Sleeping with Ghosts special edition. Far Out'' described the band's version as "simply brilliant" and wrote, "[Brian] Molko's vocal performance is both far removed and utterly akin to Morrissey's own performance, yet somehow Molko takes it to another level."

References

The Smiths songs
1986 singles
Songs written by Morrissey
Songs written by Johnny Marr
1986 songs
Rough Trade Records singles
UK Independent Singles Chart number-one singles